Pseudoclappia, the false clapdaisies, is a genus of North American shrubs in the tribe Tageteae within the family Asteraceae.

 Species
 Pseudoclappia arenaria Rydb. - Texas, New Mexico, Oklahoma, Coahuila
 Pseudoclappia watsonii A.M.Powell & B.L.Turner - western Texas

References

Flora of North America
Asteraceae genera
Tageteae